Havka is a village and municipality in Kežmarok District in the Prešov Region of northern Slovakia.

History
In historical records the village was first mentioned in 1337.   The village's history is tied in with that of the nearby Červený Kláštor Carthusian Monastery. More recently, in the nineteenth century, a number of ethnic Germans settled here.

Geography
The municipality lies at an altitude of 633 metres and covers an area of 6.013 km².
It has a population of about 42 people.

See also
 List of municipalities and towns in Slovakia

References

Genealogical resources

The records for genealogical research are available at the state archive "Statny Archiv in Levoca, Slovakia"

 Roman Catholic church records (births/marriages/deaths): 1766-1898 (parish B)

External links
Surnames of living people in Havka

Villages and municipalities in Kežmarok District